Rafael del Villar (born April 11, 1962, in Mexico City, Mexico) is a Mexican actor.

Life

He began his career in telenovela Chispita in 1983. del Villar has acted in several telenovelas.

Filmography

References

External links 
 

1962 births
Living people
Mexican male telenovela actors
Mexican male television actors
Mexican male film actors
20th-century Mexican male actors
21st-century Mexican male actors
Male actors from Mexico City
People from Mexico City